Current Events is a studio album by jazz guitarist John Abercrombie with bassist Marc Johnson and drummer Peter Erskine recorded in 1985 in Oslo and released on the ECM label.

Reception
The Allmusic review by Ron Wynn awarded the album four stars out of five, stating, "The three take chances, converge, collide, alternate time in the spotlight, and make emphatic, unpredictable music while never staying locked into one groove or style". The Penguin Guide to Jazz awarded the album 3 stars stating, "Current Events, which introduces two of the guitarist's most sympathetic and responsive partners, is still a very strong statement".

Track listing

Personnel
John Abercrombie – guitar, guitar synthesizer
Marc Johnson – double bass
Peter Erskine – drums

References

ECM Records albums
John Abercrombie (guitarist) albums
1986 albums
Albums produced by Manfred Eicher